The women's competition of the high diving events at the 2015 World Aquatics Championships was held on 4 August 2015. The competition was divided into three rounds with jumps of 20m.

Results
Round 1–2 was held at 14:00. Round 3 was held at 15:00.

References

Women
World